Ticlla (possibly from Quechua for eyelash; two-colored, or for 'with alternating colors') is a   mountain in the Chila mountain range in the Andes of Peru. It is located in the Arequipa Region, Castilla Province, Chachas District. Ticlla lies southwest of Chila and Chila Pillune at a valley named Puncuhuaico (possibly from Quechua for p'unqu pond, dam, wayq'u valley or stream). Its intermittent stream flows to Chachas Lake.

References

Mountains of Peru
Mountains of Arequipa Region